Mpumalanga, also widely known as Hammarsdale, is a town in eThekwini in the KwaZulu-Natal province of South Africa. It is a township about 10 km south-south-east of Cato Ridge and some 50 km west of Durban. Derived from Zulu, the name means 'sunrise', 'the sun comes out'.

The township boasts of a local library known as Mpumalanga Library and a shopping center which has become the heart of the township known as the Hammarsdale Junction. There is a local stadium and an Elangeni college campus located in the heart of Mpumalanga. Among amenities such as clinics, police stations, a SASSA and a home affairs office, the township has a variety of schools, some of which are mentioned below.

Legacy of political conflict 
The township was engulfed in severe political violence in the latter 1980s to early 1990s and was one of the hotspots of political conflict in KwaZulu-Natal.

References 

Populated places in eThekwini Metropolitan Municipality
Townships in KwaZulu-Natal